Scott Schreiman is an American technology executive who founded Samepage Labs Inc., a productivity and collaboration suite company in Campbell, California. Samepage Labs was acquired by Paylocity on Nov 16, 2020. 

Prior to that, Schreiman served as CEO and Executive Chairman of Kerio Technologies, Inc., a $25 million mail server, firewall and VoIP software vendor. Samepage was spun out of Kerio in 2015. Kerio was acquired in Jan. 2017 by GFI Software. 

Schreiman was named a top global influencer in the enterprise technology industry by a panel of industry experts in 2012.

In September 2013, the C2SV Technology Conference tapped Schreiman as an expert on workplace reinvention to moderate a session with Yahoo! chair Maynard Webb and NextSpace CEO Jeremy Neuner.

Early career

Schreiman was vice president and general manager of Aladdin Knowledge Systems, Inc. from August 1994 to March 1998 (3 years 8 months).

He was also the co-founder of MovieWeb.com, a leading film entertainment portal.

References 

Living people
American business executives
Claremont McKenna College alumni
Year of birth missing (living people)